Evan Duthie (born 25 November 2000) is a Scottish DJ and music producer. A native of Aberdeen, Duthie began working as a DJ in 2015. He has played at events including BPM, Morning Gloryville, and Enjoy Music festival.  Duthie has gained support from the likes of Annie Mac, Monki, Melé, Redlight and Hannah Wants. In November 2015, Evan played for Annie Mac's AMP Tour at the 02 Academy, Glasgow.

Personal life

Duthie lives in Aberdeenshire, Scotland with his parents and one brother. He attended Kemnay Academy. Duthie grew up listening to his father's extensive vinyl collection.

Career

Evan was born in Aberdeen and has always had a passion and ear for music. He launched his career in summer 2015, aged just 14 with his first show at a festival in Norway. Since then he has been booked to play at numerous festivals including Enjoy, Belladrum, Cultivate and Field Trip Festival as well as Ibiza Rocks, SWG3, Oval Space, supported MK at Unit 51 and for Radio 1’s Annie Mac’s UK tour at the o2 Academy, Glasgow. He as played alongside some of the most influential names in the industry: Annie Mac, Green Velvet, John Digweed, Melé, MK and Mella Dee to name a few... Evan has also made a name for himself in Ibiza - within a day of being on the island he secured his first set at Hush. He also performed at the legendary Ibiza Rocks
  

In 2020, despite the music industry taking a huge hit, Evan spent lockdown in his studio creating music, which lead to his track ‘You Got Lucky’ sparking enormous support from numerous BBC radio 1 shows including 2 plays by the one & only Pete Tong as well as Annie Mac. He released his debut single on Glasgow Underground which reached #22 in the Beatport Top 100 chart. His follow up single ‘For You’ was made Jaguar’s ‘Dance Floor Moment’ when she covered Danny Howard’s Radio 1 show! In 2021, Evan released a 3 track EP on Hannah Want’s Etiquette label and a 2 track EP on W&O Street Tracks picking up support from the likes of Danny Howard, ANTS, Gorgon City and MK.

In November 2015, Duthie won the Pride Of Aberdeen Award in the 'One to Watch' music category'. In June 2016, he performed at the Enjoy Music Festival where other artists playing included Example and Dusky.  In August 2016, Duthie played at Morning Gloryville at the Oval Space in London. In summer 2017, he traveled to Ibiza and played at places including Hush & Ibiza Rocks.

Duthie became an endorsee of ACS Custom, a custom earplug company at the beginning of 2016 and has recently in September became an ambassador for the British Tinnitus Association (BTA).

Discography

References

External links
 
 Evan Duthie on Instagram
 Evan Duthie on Twitter

2000 births
Scottish DJs
People from Aberdeenshire
Living people
People educated at Kemnay Academy
Electronic dance music DJs